The Wallington Public Schools is a comprehensive community public school district that serves students in kindergarten through twelfth grade from Wallington, in Bergen County, New Jersey, United States.

As of the 2018–19 school year, the district, comprising three schools, had an enrollment of 1,283 students and 86.1 classroom teachers (on an FTE basis), for a student–teacher ratio of 14.9:1.

The district is classified by the New Jersey Department of Education as being in District Factor Group "B", the second lowest of eight groupings. District Factor Groups organize districts statewide to allow comparison by common socioeconomic characteristics of the local districts. From lowest socioeconomic status to highest, the categories are A, B, CD, DE, FG, GH, I and J.

Starting in 2014, the district began discussions with the Carlstadt-East Rutherford Regional School District for a proposal in which the 350 Wallington students would be added to the 500 already attending Henry P. Becton Regional High School for grades 9-12. The consolidation would allow for Wallington High School to be reused for other purposes, avoiding the need to build a new high school building, and could allow for elimination of duplicate administrators.

Schools 
Schools in the district (with 2018–19 enrollment data from the National Center for Education Statistics) are:
Elementary schools
Jefferson Elementary School with 243 students in grades K-3
Dr. Yvette Lozanski, Principal
Frank W. Gavlak Elementary School with 426 students in grades K-6
Nancy J. Giambrone, Principal
High school
Wallington High School with 567 students in grades 7-12
Fred 'Mike' Fromfield, Principal
Dany Estupinan, Vice Principal

Administration 
Core members of the district's administration include:
James J. Albro, Superintendent
Joseph C. Brunacki III, Business Administrator / Board Secretary

Board of education
The district's board of education, with nine members, sets policy and oversees the fiscal and educational operation of the district through its administration. As a Type II school district, the board's trustees are elected directly by voters to serve three-year terms of office on a staggered basis, with three seats up for election each year held (since 2012) as part of the November general election. The board appoints a superintendent to oversee the day-to-day operation of the district.

References

External links
Wallington Public Schools
 
School Data for the Wallington Public Schools, National Center for Education Statistics

Wallington, New Jersey
New Jersey District Factor Group B
School districts in Bergen County, New Jersey